Irvine Rugby Football Club is a Rugby Football club in the Scottish Rugby Union, that now plays its rugby in the . They are based in Irvine, Scotland and play their Rugby at Marress.

History

Beginning 

Irvine Royal Academy was predominantly a football playing school until the late forties when a rugby playing gym teacher arrived at the school. Harry "Stasher" Murray set about introducing rugby football to the uninitiated of Irvine. For twelve or so years, those who wished to continue playing rugby after school, had to travel to Ardrossan Academicals to play at the club there. In the early sixties some senior pupils at the school suggested that it was time that Irvine should have a team of its own and a meeting was held. By late 1962 Irvine Royal Academicals had been constituted with Bill Inglis, a history teacher at the school, as its first president. A young Alastair McHarg was fixture secretary, with Gus McIntyre as secretary and Alister Rennie as treasurer.

From that December to March 1963 the committee chose the club colours of a maroon jersey, as Gala were the only team who were known to play in that colour at that time and also blue stockings to connect with the school colours. Interest in the town was so strong that fixtures were organised for two teams.

First season 

1963–64 was the first competitive season for the Irvine squad and one unlikely ever to be repeated again. The first time the try line had been crossed by an opposing player was not until halfway through the season. Irvine had gone four months without conceding a try, an unbelievable feat nowadays. Irvine were only defeated once in their inaugural season and their club captain John McHarg, who was involved with the club as a coach for many decades after being a player, set the standard for his future successors.

Players and club name change 1969 

Players at the club in 1969 included Jimmy Williamson, Bill Nolan, Jimmy McDowell, Bill McCulloch, Alastair Kennedy, Ronnie Alexander, George Blackie, Alan Stirling, William Kerr, David Grier, John McHarg, John Paton, Harry Fox, Alasdair Camlin, Peter Coull, Bill Browning, Campbell Cunningham, Jim Gemmell, John Shearer, Joe Hobson and George McDowall.

The club were conscious of the population explosion in the area. With a number of new schools opening with the development of Irvine New Town the team colours remained the same, although the club would now be known as Irvine Rugby Football Club.

Irvine Sevens

The club run the Irvine Sevens.

New Town Sevens

This Sevens tournament was peripatetic around the new towns of Scotland:- East Kilbride, Glenrothes, Cumbernauld, Livingston and Irvine. The town's rugby clubs of East Kilbride RFC, Glenrothes RFC, Cumbernauld RFC, Livingston RFC and Irvine RFC would play in a Sevens tournament to become the New Town Sevens Champions and win the Scottish New Towns Cup.

Honours

 New Towns Sevens
 Champions: 1979
 Arran Sevens
 Champions: 1988, 1990, 1993, 2019
 Helensburgh Sevens
 Champions: 1988
 Cumnock Sevens
 Champions: 1985
 Clydesdale Sevens
 Champions: 1998
 Drumpellier Sevens
 Champions: 1988, 1989

References

External links
 Official website

Scottish rugby union teams
Rugby union in North Ayrshire
Irvine, North Ayrshire